Lakshmipathy Balaji (born 27th September 1981) is an Indian cricket coach and former cricketer. He is a right arm fast medium bowler. He announced his retirement from first-class and List A cricket in November, 2016. He was the bowling coach for Chennai Super Kings, his former side in the Indian Premier League.

Personal life
Lakshmipathy Balaji was born on 27th September, 1981 in Madras, Tamil Nadu, India. He married former Miss Chennai beauty pageant Priya Thalur in 2013.

International cricket
Balaji became a member of the Indian cricket team as Fast Medium bowler in 2003.  Playing for his state team since 2001, he made his Test debut against New Zealand at Ahmedabad in 2003. He was recognised after his performance in the 2004 India Pakistan series. In that series, he played a significant part in Indian team's historic victories. But after an injury, his international cricket career was put on hold. He made a comeback in Pakistan's 2005 tour of India, taking 5 wickets in the first innings. Injury kept him out of cricket for the next 3 years. Balaji made his return to domestic cricket in 2007. After a strong 2008 domestic season where Balaji was instrumental in helping Tamil Nadu reach the Ranji Trophy semifinals, Balaji was called up to the international squad in January 2009 to replace an injured Munaf Patel who sustained a groin injury. Balaji was included in the playing XI for the final match of the series against Sri Lanka. India went on to lose the match. Balaji was rested for the subsequent Twenty20 match. In February the BCCI announced that Balaji had been dropped from the ODI squad to tour New Zealand but had been selected for the test squad. Thus marking Balaji's return to the test squad after a five-year hiatus having last been part of the test squad in the 2004 series against Pakistan.

On 18 July 2012 he was included in 30 probables for the World T20 tournament to be played in Sri Lanka in September 2012. Subsequently, he was selected in the final 15-member squad. He made his comeback into the Indian side in the second T20 International against New Zealand at his home ground-Chennai.

Indian Premier League
Balaji played for the Chennai Super Kings team in the 1st 3 editions of the IPL starting from the 2008 Indian Premier League. On 10 May 2008, he picked up the first hat-trick of the IPL tournament in the match against Kings XI Punjab at Chennai, and rounded off the evening with a match-winning five-wicket haul. His tournament was to end on a low as he bowled the final over to Shane Warne and Sohail Tanvir, with the latter hitting the winning runs off the final ball. Since his successful spinal operation in England by Prof. John Dowell he has returned to full form. Balaji has been notably consistent for the economy rate in all T20 matches in the IPL Chennai Super Kings as the normal matches of T20 seldom had run chases below or near 130 . He has not done much in the batting side of IPL.

In the second season of the Indian Premier League, he picked four wickets against Rajasthan Royals on 30 April 2009, leading the Chennai Super Kings to victory.

In the 3rd season of IPL, Balaji played 7 games and picked up 7 wickets. After won the tournament and went on to play the ACLT20, Balaji played most of the games in the tournament and his economical bowling was praised by the captain of the Indian team, MS Dhoni and was listed by him as one of the reasons to CSK's victory in the tournament.

In the fourth season of the IPL, he was purchased by Kolkata Knight Riders.

In the seventh season of the IPL, he was purchased by Kings XI Punjab.

Coaching career
He was appointed as bowling coach and mentor for Kolkata Knight Riders.

For the 2018 IPL edition, he was appointed as the bowling coach for Chennai Super Kings. He decided to take a one-year break from the post in 2022, citing personal reasons, but continued to be available for Super Kings Academy.

References

Sources
L Balaji calls time on first-class, List A career, 16 September 2016

1981 births
Living people
India Test cricketers
India One Day International cricketers
India Twenty20 International cricketers
Indian cricketers
Tamil Nadu cricketers
Tamil sportspeople
Chennai Super Kings cricketers
Kolkata Knight Riders cricketers
South Zone cricketers
Wellington cricketers
India Green cricketers
India Red cricketers
Cricketers from Chennai
Indian cricket coaches
Punjab Kings cricketers